C. Van Der Zee House is a historic home located at Coeymans Hollow in Albany County, New York.  It was built about 1850 and is a rectangular, two story heavy timber frame dwelling on a random coursed rubblestone foundation. It has a one-story gable roofed wing. It has a Greek Revival style recessed entry door.  Also on the property are a barn (c. 1850), fruit barn (c. 1870), barn foundation (c. 1850), shed (c. 1870), and a chicken coop (c. 1870).

It was listed on the National Register of Historic Places in 2002.

References

Houses on the National Register of Historic Places in New York (state)
Houses completed in 1850
Houses in Albany County, New York
National Register of Historic Places in Albany County, New York